Boombastic may refer to:

 Boombastic (album), a 1995 album by Shaggy
 "Boombastic" (song), a song by Shaggy from the album
 Boombastic Hits, a 2003 compilation album by Shaggy
 Boombastic, a 1990 album by Little John

See also

Bombastic (disambiguation)